The 1st Golden Globe Awards, honoring the best achievements in 1943 filmmaking, were held late on January 20, 1944, at the 20th Century Fox studios in Los Angeles, California.

Winners

Best Picture 
The Song of Bernadette

Best Actor in a Leading Role 
Paul Lukas - Watch on the Rhine as Kurt Muller

Best Actress in a Leading Role 
Jennifer Jones - The Song of Bernadette as Bernadette

Best Performance by an Actor in a Supporting Role in a Motion Picture 
Akim Tamiroff - For Whom the Bell Tolls as Pablo

Best Performance by an Actress in a Supporting Role in a Motion Picture 
Katina Paxinou - For Whom the Bell Tolls as Pilar

Best Director-Motion Picture 
Henry King - The Song of Bernadette

Comparison with the Academy Awards
The 16th Academy Awards, presented six weeks later, on March 2, 1944, featured among its nominations the same six, three of which were also winners — Best Actor: Paul Lukas, Best Actress: Jennifer Jones and Best Supporting Actress: Katina Paxinou.

See also
 Hollywood Foreign Press Association
 16th Academy Awards
 1943 in film

References

001
1943 film awards
January 1944 events